Princess is a title of royalty or nobility. It may also refer to:

Places
 Princess, Kentucky, United States, an unincorporated community
 Princess, a locality in the County of Newell, Alberta, Canada

People
 Princess (singer) (born 1961), 1980s pop music singer
 Princess Halliday, TV personality
 The Princess (drag queen), American drag queen

Arts, entertainment, and media

In print 
 Princess (magazine), a Japanese manga magazine
 Princess: A True Story of Life Behind the Veil in Saudi Arabia, a book by Jean Sasson

Film and television 
 Princess (2006 film), a Danish animated film
 Princess (2008 film), an American TV movie
 Princess (2010 film), a Finnish film
 Princess (2014 film), an Israeli film
 Princess (web series), Flash animation by Matt Stone and Trey Parker
 Princess (TV series), a money management reality program
 Princesses (TV series), 1991 American situation comedy
 Princess, the nickname of the main character Aelita Scaheffer from the French animated series Code Lyoko and Code Lyoko: Evolution
 Princess Buchanan, a character from the BBC soap opera Doctors
 Princess (The Walking Dead), a fictional character from The Walking Dead

Music

Albums
 Princess (Princess album)
 Princess (Jam Hsiao album)
 Princess (EP), an EP by Sebadoh

Songs
 "Princess" (Dmitry Koldun song), 2009
 "Princess" (Short Stack song), 2009
 "Princess", a song by Elton John from his album Jump Up!

Brands and enterprises
 Princess (Beanie Baby), a collectible made by Ty Inc. in 1997 in memory of Princess Diana
 Princess Cruises, a cruise brand owned by Carnival Corporation & plc
 P&O Princess Cruises, a British shipping company that operated 2000-2003
 Disney Princess, a media franchise owned by The Walt Disney Company
 Fairmont Hamilton Princess, the oldest hotel in the Fairmont chains
 Princess telephone, a compact telephone designed for convenient use in the bedroom
 Princess Yachts, a UK motor yacht maker
 Princess, a fragrance by Vera Wang

Theatres
 Princess Theatre (disambiguation)
 Princess or Princess's Theatre, London, which closed in 1902

Transport 
 Princess (car) (1975–81), a motor car produced in the United Kingdom by British Leyland from 1975 until 1981
 Austin Princess, Princess and Vanden Plas Princess (1947–68), a British motor car
 Saunders-Roe Princess, a very large British flying boat aircraft of the 1950s
 SS Princess, a Canadian steamboat
 Princess, a stern-wheel steamer acquired by the Union Navy as USS Naiad (1863) during the American Civil War

Other uses 
 HMS Princess, seven Royal Navy ships
 Princess (chess), a fairy chess piece moving as bishop or knight
 Princess (poem), by Russian poet Apollon Maykov, published in 1878
 Princess (beauty pageant), held in Japan
 Princess (pigeon), recipient of the Dickon Medal in 1946 for bravery during the Second World War

See also 
 Princess cut, the second most popular diamond cut shape
 The Princess (disambiguation)
 Princesse (disambiguation)